Sir Rowland Ricketts Phillips (1904-1976) was a Jamaican judge. He served as Chief Justice of Jamaica from 1963 to 1968.

Early life and education
Rowland Ricketts Phillips was born in Montego Bay, Jamaica, on September 30, 1904. He was the son of George Augustus Phillips. Phillips attended Cornwall College.

Legal career

He was elevated to serve as a Puisne Judge of the Supreme Court of Guyana on January 27, 1954. He was named a Puisne Judge of the Supreme Court of Jamaica on October 23, 1959. Phillips was sworn in as Acting Governor General on August 2, 1967 by then Governor General Sir Clifford Campbell.

Personal life
In 1947, Phillips married Enid Daphne Limonius. He had four children, including two daughters: Ambassador Elinor Felix and Justice Hilary Phillips.: and two sons, Rowland (aka 'Rennie') and Geoffrey.

Honors and awards
Rowland Phillips was knighted by Queen Elizabeth II on October 15, 1964.

References 

Chief justices of Jamaica
Jamaican knights
1904 births
1976 deaths
Cornwall College, Jamaica alumni
20th-century Jamaican judges